USS LSM-56 was a  in the United States Navy during World War II.

Construction and career 
LSM-56 was laid down on 30 June 1944 at Brown Shipbuilding Co., Houston, Texas, launched on 21 July 1944 and commissioned on 31 August 1944.

During World War II, LSM-56 was assigned to the Asiatic-Pacific theater. She took part in the Battle of Okinawa from 2 April to 17 June 1945. She was later assigned to occupation service in the Far East from 4 to 20 September and 8 October to 20 November 1945.

LSM-56 was decommissioned on 18 March 1946 at Norfolk Navy Yard, Portsmouth.

She was struck from the Navy Register on 12 April 1946.

The ship was later sold on 23 October 1947 as military surplus, to Charles N. Wilson for St. John Tugboat Company in East Saint John, New Brunswick, Canada. LSM-46, LSM-78 and LSM-89 were also sold to the same owner to be used as barges.

They were all put out of service in 1960 and sold for scrap. Halfway through the scrapping process, the ships were abandoned thus her together with LSM-46 remained at the Musquash Estuary. They are now part of the landscape and a point of interest. Another unidentified LSM is present in the middle of the river, capsized in place.

Awards 
LST-56 have earned the following awards:

American Campaign Medal
Asiatic-Pacific Campaign Medal (1 battle star) 
Navy Occupation Service Medal (with Asia clasp)
World War II Victory Medal

External links 

Video of the abandoned LSM-46 and LSM-56

Citations

Sources 
 
 
 
 

World War II amphibious warfare vessels of the United States
Ships built in Houston
1944 ships
LSM-1-class landing ships medium